Dzhangir Abbasovich Kerimov (18 July 1923 – 22 February 2015) was an Azerbaijani-Russian lawyer, Dr. of Laws (LL.D.), Professor, corresponding member of the Academy of Sciences of the Soviet Union (since 1966); full member (academician) of the Azerbaijani, Serbian, Finnish, Montenegro Academies of Sciences; researcher at the Institute of State and Law of the Russian Academy of Sciences; full member of the Russian Academy of Social Sciences; member of the Social Sciences Department Bureau (section of philosophy, sociology, psychology and law); Chairman of the Scientific and Expert Council under the Union of Lawyers of Russia. He is one of the leading experts on philosophical problems of legal science, social planning and administration, theory of state and law.

References

External links
Official site of the Russian Academy of Sciences
Institute of Socio-Political Research

1923 births
2015 deaths
Lawyers from Baku
Corresponding Members of the Russian Academy of Sciences
Corresponding Members of the USSR Academy of Sciences
Kutafin Moscow State Law University alumni
Members of the Finnish Academy of Science and Letters
Members of the Montenegrin Academy of Sciences and Arts
Recipients of the Order of Friendship of Peoples
Recipients of the Order of the Red Banner of Labour
Jurisprudence academics
Azerbaijani jurists
Russian jurists
Russian legal scholars
Soviet jurists
Burials in Troyekurovskoye Cemetery
Foreign members of the Serbian Academy of Sciences and Arts